Francine Schöning (born 15 April 2005) is a German rhythmic gymnast. She won silver in the senior team category at the 2022 World Championships.

Personal life 
In mid-2021 she moved from Berlin to Schmiden in Germany in order to train and study at the national gymnastics training centre. "I had no worries about looking for an apartment because I moved into the RSG boarding school. The move to Schmiden, like any other move, was of course stressful. Saying goodbye to the Poelchau High School in Berlin was very difficult for me, but I slowly got used to the school system here."

Career 
She was selected as a reserve for the 2022 Rhythmic Gymnastics European Championships in Tel Aviv, Israel, the group came in 12th place in the all-around. In the team ranking (individual and group), the German team placed 5th.  In late August Schöning debuted in competition at the World Cup in Cluj-Napoca, winning bronze in the 3 ribbons + 2 balls' final. The following month Francine participated at the 2022 World Championships in Sofia, Bulgaria, the group made mistakes in the 5 hoops routine (that was scored 25.950) relegated them in 14th place in the All-Around, but they qualified for the 3 ribbons + 2 balls' final with the 6th score, the same place they ended up in the final. Following Bulgaria and Israel's withdrawal Germany was able to medal in the team competition, Hannah and her teammates Anja Kosan, Daniella Kromm, Alina Oganesyan, Hannah Vester and the two individuals Margarita Kolosov and Darja Varfolomeev were awarded silver for their results.

References 

2005 births
Living people
German rhythmic gymnasts
Medalists at the Rhythmic Gymnastics World Championships
21st-century German women